The Codex Bernensis known also as Fragmenta Bernensia, designated by t (traditional system) or 19 (in Beuron system), is a 5th or 6th century Latin manuscript of the New Testament. The text, written on vellum, is a version of the old Latin. The manuscript contains the fragments of the Gospel of Mark (1:2-23; 2:22-27; 3:11-18), on only 2 parchment leaves. Written in two columns per page, 23 lines per column. It is a palimpsest.

The Latin text of the codex is a representative of the Western text-type in Itala recension.

The text of the codex was edited by Hermann Hagen in 1884.

Currently it is housed at the Burgerbibliothek Bern (Cod. 611) in Bern.

See also 

 List of New Testament Latin manuscripts

References

Further reading 

 Hermann Hagen, Ein Italafragment aus einem Berner Palimpsest des VI Jahrhunderts ZWT, XXVII (1884), pp. 470–484.
 A. Jülicher, Itala. Das Neue Testament in Altlateinischer Überlieferung, Walter de Gruyter, Berlin, New York, 1976. (Marcus Evangelium)

Vetus Latina New Testament manuscripts
6th-century biblical manuscripts
Palimpsests